Richmond Community Schools is a school district headquartered in Richmond, Michigan.

Schools
 Richmond High School
 Richmond Middle School
 Will L. Lee Elementary School

External links
 Richmond Community Schools

School districts in Michigan
Education in Macomb County, Michigan
Education in St. Clair County, Michigan